Thysanoes is a genus of typical bark beetles in the family Curculionidae. There are about 7 described species in Thysanoes.

Species
 Thysanoes berbericolens Wood, 1971
 Thysanoes berschemiae Blackman, 1920
 Thysanoes fimbricornis LeConte, 1876
 Thysanoes lobdelli Blackman, 1920
 Thysanoes pallens Wood, 1956
 Thysanoes texanus Blackman, 1943
 Thysanoes xylophagus Blackman, 1928

References

Further reading

 
 
 
 

Scolytinae